Margaret Macrae is a former swimming representative from New Zealand.

At the 1966 British Empire and Commonwealth Games she won the bronze medal in the women's 220 yards backstroke. During the Games she competed in a variety of events including the 110 yards backstroke, 440 yards freestyle and 440 yards medley relay.

Macrae competed at the previous British Empire and Commonwealth Games in Perth where she came 7th in both the 110 and 220 yards backstroke.

References

Commonwealth Games bronze medallists for New Zealand
New Zealand female swimmers
Swimmers at the 1962 British Empire and Commonwealth Games
Swimmers at the 1966 British Empire and Commonwealth Games
Living people
Commonwealth Games medallists in swimming
Year of birth missing (living people)
Female backstroke swimmers
New Zealand female freestyle swimmers
20th-century New Zealand women
Medallists at the 1966 British Empire and Commonwealth Games